The Amari distance is a measure between two invertible matrices, useful for checking for convergence in independent component analysis algorithms and for comparing solutions.

For two invertible matrices , it is defined as:

It is non-negative and cancels if and only if  is a scale and permutation matrix, i.e. the product of a diagonal matrix and a permutation matrix.

References

Signal estimation